Rugby tens, also known as ten-a-side and Xs, is a variant of rugby union in which teams are made up of ten players, typically five forwards and five backs.  Matches are much shorter, usually played as two ten-minute halves.

Unlike the other two major rugby union variants - sevens and beach rugby - which were invented in major rugby nations, rugby tens was developed in Malaysia, a nation that has never qualified for the Rugby World Cup.

The rules (law variations) are similar to rugby sevens and are published on the World Rugby website.

History
Rugby tens was introduced by the Combined Old Boys Rugby Association (COBRA) of Malaysia in 1967 primarily, to enable Asian players to better compete with against larger-sized players from the traditional rugby playing nations. COBRA organized the first Rugby ten-a-side, tournament, COBRA 10s, that same year. It has grown from a local tournament into a prestigious international tournament, with more than 40 nations have been represented to date. Many players who have participated in the COBRA 10s have gone on to don national colours.

The game is fairly popular in Malaysia, Indonesia, Singapore, Republic of Korea and Thailand, and especially in South Africa where it is growing very fast. Other tournaments have been organised in Europe, Africa, Australasia and North America.

Features of the game
A rugby tens match has two halves of 10 minutes each, though the tournament organiser may change this rule. The scrum has five players, instead of eight as in rugby XV or three as in rugby sevens.

Unlike sevens rugby, tens offer players of diverse skills, capabilities and different fitness levels the opportunity to continue to enjoy the game they love so much. The more traditional scrums and lineouts are part of the game whilst the fact that there is a bit more space on the field, however not too much as to expose the slower forwards on the defensive lines, makes this a very popular game for all levels of players.

Tournaments
Major rugby tens tournaments include:
 COBRA Rugby Tens (since 1967)
 Hong Kong Football Club Tens (since 1986),
 Cape Town Tens (since 2009)
 World Club 10s (2014-2018)
 Brisbane Global Rugby Tens (2017-2018)
 Flanders Open Rugby (since 1993),
 Manila 10s (since 1989)
 Stockholm 10s (since 1993)

The popular Cape Town Tens attracts teams from all over the world to South Africa during the first week of February each year.

References
 Bath, Richard (ed.) The Complete Book of Rugby (Seven Oaks Ltd, 1997 )

External links

Current tournaments

Former tournaments

 
Sports originating in Malaysia
Tens
Tens